Luca Ricci (born 13 March 1989) is an Italian footballer who plays as a defender for  club Viterbese.

Career
He made his début on 1 June 2008, in a Serie B match against Ravenna.

In 2009–10 season, he was loaned to Pavia for one season, and in the next, to Pergocrema.

On 9 July 2019, he joined Cesena.

On 20 August 2021, he joined Pistoiese.

On 17 January 2022, he moved to Viterbese.

References

External links 
 
 

1989 births
Living people
Sportspeople from the Province of Arezzo
Footballers from Tuscany
Italian footballers
Association football defenders
Serie A players
Serie B players
Serie C players
Lega Pro Seconda Divisione players
A.C. Cesena players
F.C. Pavia players
U.S. Pergolettese 1932 players
Ascoli Calcio 1898 F.C. players
S.S.D. Varese Calcio players
U.S. Catanzaro 1929 players
U.S. Pistoiese 1921 players
U.S. Ancona 1905 players
S.S. Monopoli 1966 players
Carrarese Calcio players
Cesena F.C. players
U.S. Viterbese 1908 players
Italy youth international footballers